In biology, inoculum refers to the source material used for inoculation. Inoculum may refer to:
 In medicine, material that is the source of the inoculation in a vaccine
 In microbiology, propagules: cells, tissue, or viruses that are used to inoculate a new culture
 Microbial inoculant, the beneficial introduction of microbes to improve plant health
 A method of propagation of fungal plant disease transmission
 Fermentation starter, in food production

See also:
 Fear Inoculum, a 2019 album by American rock band Tool